Empires in Arms the Napoleonic Wars is a strategy video game based upon Australian Design Group's boardgame Empires in Arms, developed by American studio Outflank Strategy Wargames.

2004 video games
Windows games
Windows-only games
Napoleonic Wars video games
Computer wargames
Video games developed in the United States
World conquest video games
Matrix Games games
Multiplayer and single-player video games